Maryland Route 781 (MD 781) is a state highway in the U.S. state of Maryland. Known as Delancy Road, the state highway runs  from U.S. Route 40 (US 40) north to MD 281 in Elkton close to the Delaware state line. Delancy Road was brought into the state highway system as MD 781 in 1984.

Route description

The highway heads north as a two-lane undivided road to the west of the state line and to the east of Grays Hill. MD 781 leaves the town of Elkton about halfway through its course, but the route follows a finger of unincorporated area between sections of the town to its northern terminus.

History
Delancy Road long predates being a part of the state highway system, the road having existed since at least 1898. The highway was designated MD 781 in December 1984 after being transferred from county to state maintenance in a May 16, 1984, road transfer agreement.

Junction list

See also

References

External links

MDRoads: MD 781
MD 781 at AARoads.com

781
Maryland Route 781